Trichodothella is a genus of fungi in the family Venturiaceae. This is a monotypic genus, containing the single species Trichodothella blumeri.

References

External links
Trichodothella at Index Fungorum

Venturiaceae
Monotypic Dothideomycetes genera